Vladimir of Duklja may refer to:

 Jovan Vladimir of Duklja, Prince of Duklja, and Christian Saint (d. 1016)
 Vladimir II of Duklja, Prince of Duklja, from 1103 to 1113

See also
 Vladimir (disambiguation)
 George of Duklja (disambiguation)
 Michael of Duklja (disambiguation)
 Duklja